The Atlantic Coast Conference (ACC) is a collegiate athletic conference located in the eastern United States. Headquartered in Greensboro, North Carolina, the ACC's fifteen member universities compete in the National Collegiate Athletic Association (NCAA)'s Division I. ACC football teams compete in the NCAA Division I Football Bowl Subdivision. The ACC sponsors competition in twenty-five sports with many of its member institutions held in high regard nationally. Current members of the conference are Boston College, Clemson University, Duke University, Georgia Institute of Technology, Florida State University, North Carolina State University, Syracuse University, the University of Louisville, the University of Miami, the University of North Carolina, the University of Notre Dame, the University of Pittsburgh, the University of Virginia, Virginia Polytechnic Institute and State University, and Wake Forest University.

ACC teams and athletes have claimed dozens of national championships in multiple sports throughout the conference's history. Generally, the ACC's top athletes and teams in any particular sport in a given year are considered to be among the top collegiate competitors in the nation. Additionally, the conference enjoys extensive media coverage. With the advent of the College Football Playoff in 2014, the ACC is one of the "Power Five" conferences with a contractual tie-in to a New Year's Six bowl game in the sport of football.

The ACC was founded on May 8, 1953, by seven universities located in the South Atlantic States, with the University of Virginia joining in early December 1953 to bring the membership to eight. The loss of South Carolina in 1971 dropped membership to seven, while the addition of Georgia Tech in 1979 for non-football sports and 1983 for football brought it back to eight, and Florida State's arrival in 1991 for non-football sports and 1992 for football increased the membership to nine. Since 2000, with the widespread reorganization of the NCAA, seven additional schools have joined, and one original member (Maryland) has left to bring it to the current membership of 15 schools. The additions in recent years extended the conference's footprint into the Northeast and Midwest.

ACC member universities represent a range of private and public universities of various enrollment sizes, all of which participate in the Atlantic Coast Conference Academic Consortium whose purpose is to "enrich the educational missions, especially the undergraduate student experiences, of member universities".

Member universities

Current members
The ACC has 15 member institutions from 10 states. Listed in alphabetical order, these 10 states within the ACC's geographical footprint are Florida, Georgia, Indiana, Kentucky, Massachusetts, New York, North Carolina, Pennsylvania, South Carolina, and Virginia. The geographic domain of the conference is predominantly within the Southern and Northeastern United States along the US Atlantic coast and stretches from Florida in the south to New York in the North and from Indiana in the west to Massachusetts farthest east.

When Notre Dame joined the ACC, it chose to remain a football independent. However, its football team established a special scheduling arrangement with the ACC to play a rotating selection of five ACC football teams per season. For the 2020 season, due largely to the suspension of most non-conference games by other Power Five conferences due to the COVID-19 pandemic in the United States, the ACC reached an agreement to allow Notre Dame to play a full, 10-game conference schedule and be eligible to play for the ACC championship.

Since July 1, 2014, the 15 members of the ACC are:

Notes

Former members
On July 1, 2014, the University of Maryland departed for the Big Ten Conference. In 1971, the University of South Carolina left the ACC to become an independent, later joining the Metro Conference in 1983 and moving to its current home, the Southeastern Conference, in 1991.

Membership timeline

History

Founding and early expansion
The ACC was established on June 14, 1953, when seven members of the Southern Conference left to form their own conference. These seven universities became charter members of the ACC: Clemson, Duke, Maryland, North Carolina, North Carolina State, South Carolina, and Wake Forest. They left partially due to the Southern Conference's ban on post-season football play that had been initiated in 1951. (Clemson and Maryland had both defied the Southern Conference's bowl rule following the 1951 season and were banned from playing other conference teams in the 1952 season). After drafting a set of bylaws for the creation of a new league, the seven withdrew from the Southern Conference at the spring meeting on the morning of May 8, 1953, at the Sedgefield Country Club in Greensboro, North Carolina. The bylaws were ratified on June 14, 1953, and the new conference was created. The conference officials indicated a desire to add an eighth member, and candidates mentioned were Virginia, Virginia Tech and West Virginia. On December 4, 1953, officials convened in Greensboro, North Carolina, and admitted Virginia, a former Southern Conference charter member that had been independent since 1937, into the conference. Virginia's president Colgate Darden argued fiercely against joining the ACC or any conference, while UVA athletics director Gus Tebell argued in favor. In the end, UVA's Board of Visitors approved joining the ACC by a vote of 6–3.

In 1960, the ACC implemented a minimum SAT score for incoming student-athletes of 750, the first conference to do so. This minimum was raised to 800 in 1964, but was ultimately struck down by a federal court in 1972.

On July 1, 1971, South Carolina left the ACC to become an independent.

Racial integration
Racial integration of all-white collegiate sports teams was high on the regional agenda in the 1950s and 1960s. Involved were issues of equality, racism, and the alumni demand for the top players needed to win high-profile games. The ACC took the lead. First they started to schedule integrated teams from the north. Finally ACC schools—typically under pressure from boosters and civil rights groups—integrated their teams. With an alumni base that dominated local and state politics, society and business, the ACC flagship schools were successful in their endeavor—as Pamela Grundy argues, they had learned how to win:
 The widespread admiration that athletic ability inspired would help transform athletic fields from grounds of symbolic play to forces for social change, places where a wide range of citizens could publicly and at times effectively challenge the assumptions that cast them as unworthy of full participation in U.S. society. While athletic successes would not rid society of prejudice or stereotype—black athletes would continue to confront racial slurs...[—minority star players demonstrated] the discipline, intelligence, and poise to contend for position or influence in every arena of national life.

1978 and 1991 expansions
The ACC operated with seven members until the addition of Georgia Tech from the Metro Conference, announced on April 3, 1978, and taking effect on July 1, 1979, except in football, in which Tech would remain an independent until joining ACC football in 1983. The total number of member schools reached nine with the addition of Florida State, also formerly from the Metro Conference, on July 1, 1991, in non-football sports and July 1, 1992, in football. The additions of those schools marked the first expansions of the conference footprint since 1953, though both schools were still located with the rest of the ACC schools in the South Atlantic States.

2004–2005 expansion

The ACC added three members from the Big East Conference during the 2005 conference realignment.   Initially, the conference targeted Boston College, Miami, and Syracuse.  The expansion was controversial, as Connecticut, Rutgers, Pittsburgh, and West Virginia (and, initially, Virginia Tech) filed lawsuits against the ACC, Miami, and Boston College for allegedly conspiring to weaken the Big East Conference.  Then-Virginia governor Mark Warner, who feared Virginia Tech being left behind in a weakened Big East, pressured the administration of the University of Virginia to lobby on behalf of their in-state foe.  Eventually Virginia Tech replaced Syracuse in the expansion lineup and ACC expansion was agreed upon.  Miami and Virginia Tech joined on July 1, 2004, while Boston College joined on July 1, 2005, as the league's twelfth member and the first from the Northeast.

2010–present

The ACC Hall of Champions opened on March 2, 2011, next to the Greensboro Coliseum arena, making the ACC the second college sports conference to have a hall of fame after the Southern Conference.

On September 17, 2011, Big East Conference members Syracuse University and the University of Pittsburgh both applied to join the ACC. The two schools were accepted into the conference the following day, once again expanding the conference footprint like previous expansions. Because the Big East intended to hold Pitt and Syracuse to the 27-month notice period required by league bylaws, the most likely entry date into the ACC (barring negotiations) was July 1, 2014. However, in July 2012, the Big East came to an agreement with Syracuse and Pitt that allowed the two schools to leave the Big East on July 1, 2013.

On September 12, 2012, Notre Dame agreed to join the ACC in all conference sports except football & men's ice hockey (as the ACC does not sponsor men's ice hockey; of all other ACC universities, only Boston College sponsors men's ice hockey) as the conference's first member in the Midwestern United States. As part of the agreement, Notre Dame committed to play five football games each season against ACC schools beginning in 2014. On March 12, 2013, Notre Dame and the Big East announced they had reached a settlement allowing Notre Dame to join the ACC effective July 1, 2013.

On November 19, 2012, the University of Maryland's Board of Regents voted to withdraw from the ACC to join the Big Ten Conference effective in 2014. The following week, the Big East's University of Louisville accepted the ACC's invitation to become a full member, replacing Maryland effective July 1, 2014.

The ACC's presidents announced on April 22, 2013, that all 15 schools that would be members of the conference in 2014–15 had signed a grant of media rights (GOR), effective immediately and running through the 2026–27 school year, coinciding with the duration of the conference's then-current TV deal with ESPN. This move essentially prevents the ACC from being a target for other conferences seeking to expand—under the grant, if a school leaves the conference during the contract period, all revenue derived from that school's media rights for home games would belong to the ACC and not the school. The move also left the SEC as the only one of the FBS Power Five conferences without a GOR.

In July 2016, the GOR was extended through the 2035–36 school year, coinciding with the signing of a new 20-year deal with ESPN that would transform the then-current ad hoc ACC Network into a full-fledged network. The new network launched as a digital service in the 2016–17 school year and as a linear network in August 2019.

On August 24, 2021, the ACC conference formed an alliance with the Big Ten and Pac-12 conferences.

Academics and ACCAC

Academic rankings
Among the major NCAA athletic conferences that sponsor NCAA Division I FBS football, including the current "Power Five conferences", the ACC has been regarded as having the highest academically ranked collection of members based on U.S. News & World Report and by the NCAA's Academic Progress Rate.

Association of American Universities
Five ACC institutions are members of the prestigious Association of American Universities: Duke, Georgia Tech, Pittsburgh, UNC, and Virginia. Syracuse was a member until 2011 but voluntarily withdrew over a dispute on how to count non-federal grants.

ACCAC and ACC academic network

The members of the ACC participate in the Atlantic Coast Conference Academic Consortium (ACCAC), a consortium that provides a vehicle for inter-institutional academic and administrative collaboration between member universities. Growing out of a conference-wide doctoral student-exchange program that was established in 1999, the ACCAC has expanded its scope into other domestic and international collaborations.

The stated mission of the ACCAC is to "leverage the athletic associations and identities among the 15 ACC universities in order to enrich the educational missions of member universities." To that end, the collaborative helps organize various academic initiatives, including fellowship and scholarship programs, global research initiatives, leadership conferences, and extensive study abroad programs. Funding for its operations, 90% of which is spent on direct student support, is derived from a portion of the income generated by the ACC Football Championship Game and by supplemental allocations by individual universities and various grants.

ACCAC academic programs
Major academic programs that have been implemented under ACCAC include:
 The annual Meeting of the Minds (MOM) undergraduate research conference.
 The annual Student Leadership Conference.
 The Creativity and Innovation Fellowship Program in which each university receives $12,500 to award between two and five undergraduate students ACCAC fellowships for research or creative projects.
 The Summer Research Scholars Program in which every ACC university will receive $5,000 to support up to two of its undergraduate students in conducting research in residence at another ACC university during a minimum 10 week period over the summer.
 The ACC Debate Championship
 The ACC Inventure Prize Competition is a Shark Tank-like innovation competition for teams of students from ACC universities.
 The Student Federal Relations Trip to Washington, D.C. is an annual trip of student delegates from ACC universities to the nation's capital.
 The Creativity Competition is planned to be an ACC-wide, team-based interdisciplinary competition emphasizing use of creative design and the arts to begin in 2017.
 The Distinguished Lecturers Program in which five ACC universities select an outstanding faculty member as The ACCAC's Distinguished Lecturer. In addition to an award stipend, the ACCAC provides financial support to enable each ACC university to sponsor a "distinguished lecture event" on their campus.
 The Executive Leadership Series is a two-day skill enhancement programs designed for Deans, Vice Provosts, and Vice Chancellors of ACC universities.
 The annual Student President Conference.
 The Coach for College Program, primarily for student-athletes and run through Duke University with support from the ACCAC, that takes 32 ACC students to Vietnam for three weeks in the summer to coach hundreds of middle school children.
 The Traveling Scholars Program which allows PhD candidates from one ACC campus to access courses, laboratories, library, or other resources at any one of the other ACC member institution campuses.
 The Clean Energy Grant Competition that helps coordinate geographically defined clusters of ACC universities in competition for United States Department of Energy Clean Energy Grants.
 The Study Abroad Program collaborative which allows cross registration in study abroad programs enroll in programs sponsored by an ACC university other than their "home" university. A Student Study Abroad Scholarship program that awarded two to five ACCAC scholarships for study abroad was discontinued in 2013, but is targeted for renewal in 2014–15.

The ACCAC also supports periodic meetings among faculty, administration, and staff who pursue similar interests and responsibilities at the member universities either by face-to-face conferences, video conferences, or telephone conferences. ACCAC affinity groups include those for International Affairs Officers, Study Abroad Directors, Teaching-Learning Center Directors, Chief Information Officers, Chief Procurement Officers, Undergraduate Research Conference Coordinators, Student Affairs Vice Presidents, Student Leadership Conference Coordinators, and Faculty Athletic Representatives To the ACC.

Spending and revenue
Total revenue includes ticket sales, contributions and donations, rights/licensing, student fees, school funds, and all other sources including TV income, camp income, food, and novelties. Total expenses includes coaching/staff, scholarships, buildings/grounds, maintenance, utilities and rental fees, and all other costs including recruiting, team travel, equipment and uniforms, conference dues, and insurance costs.

Facilities

Apparel

Sports
The Atlantic Coast Conference sponsors championship competition in thirteen men's and fourteen women's NCAA-sanctioned sports. The most recently added sport was fencing, added for the 2014–15 school year after having been absent from the conference since 1980; Boston College, Duke, North Carolina, and Notre Dame participate in that sport.

Since all ACC members (including non-football member Notre Dame) field FBS football teams, they are subject to the NCAA requirement that FBS schools field at least 16 teams in NCAA-recognized varsity sports. However, the ACC itself requires sponsorship of only four sports—football, men's basketball, women's basketball, and either women's soccer or women's volleyball. All ACC members sponsor all five of the named sports except Georgia Tech, which sponsors women's volleyball but not women's soccer.

Men's sponsored sports by school
Member-by-member sponsorship of the 13 men's ACC sports for the 2021–22 academic year.

Men's varsity sports not sponsored by the Atlantic Coast Conference which are played by ACC schools:

Women's sponsored sports by school
Member-by-member sponsorship of the 14 women's ACC sports for the 2020–21 academic year.  The ACC will begin sponsoring women's gymnastics in 2023–24.

Women's varsity sports not currently sponsored by the Atlantic Coast Conference which are played by ACC schools:

Current champions

Football

The ACC is considered to be one of the Power Five conferences, all of which receive automatic placement of their football champions into one of the six major bowl games. Seven of its members claim football national championships in their history, with two having won the now-defunct Bowl Championship Series (BCS) during its existence between 1998 and 2014 and one having won under the current College Football Playoff (CFP) system. Five of its members are among the top 25 of college football's all-time winningest programs. Three ACC teams, Florida State, Miami, and Clemson, are listed in the top 10 of most successful football programs since 2000.

Divisions and scheduling
In 2005, the ACC began divisional play in football. At the time, the ACC was the only NCAA Division I conference whose divisions were not divided geographically (e.g., north–south, East/West), but rather into Atlantic and Coastal (this arrangement continues today for the sports of baseball and men's soccer). The two division leaders then competed in the ACC Championship Game to determine the official conference title, which guarantees a berth in a New Year's Six bowl game. The inaugural Championship Game was played on December 3, 2005, in Jacksonville, Florida, at the venue then known as Alltel Stadium, in which Florida State defeated Virginia Tech to capture its 12th championship since it joined the league in 1992. Notre Dame began playing several ACC teams each year in 2014, but is not considered a football member and is not eligible to play in the ACC Championship Game.

On June 28, 2022, the ACC approved a new football schedule format, set to take effect in the 2023 season. Under this format, the conference will remove divisions, and instead play a 3–5–5 format, where each team plays 3 designated rivals every year along with two separate 5-team rotations that flip every other year, such that every team will have at least one home game and one away game against every other team in a four-year cycle (the standard length of a college player's career). Participation in the ACC championship game will also no longer be determined by the winners of the two divisions; the two teams with the highest conference winning percentage will play instead. The designated rivals under this system are as follows:

Additionally, this allows for each team to schedule four non-conference games. Since the 2014 season, one of the four non-conference games is against Notre Dame every two to three years, as Notre Dame plays against five ACC opponents in non-conference games each season. ACC members are also required to play at least one non-conference game each season against a team in the "Power 5" conferences since 2017. Games against Notre Dame also meet the requirement. In January 2015, the conference announced that games against another FBS independent, BYU, would also count toward the requirement. This requirement can also be met by scheduling other ACC teams in non-conference games; the first example of this was also announced in January 2015, when North Carolina and Wake Forest announced that they would play a home-and-home non-conference series in 2019 and 2021.

Prior to this, the division format was as follows:

 Six games within its division (three home, three away, one against each opponent).
 One game against a designated permanent rival from the other division (not necessarily the school's closest traditional rival, even within the conference), similar to the SEC setup.
The permanent cross-division matchups are as follows, with the Atlantic Division member listed first: Boston College–Virginia Tech; Clemson–Georgia Tech; Florida State–Miami; Louisville–Virginia; NC State–North Carolina; Syracuse–Pittsburgh; Duke-Wake.
 One rotating game against a team in the other division, for a total of two cross-division games.
Non-permanent cross-division opponents face each other in the regular season twice in a span of twelve years.
Prior to the addition of Syracuse and Pittsburgh in 2013, teams played two rotating cross-division games (for a total of three cross-division games), with a total of eight conference games. The addition of one team to each division meant the loss of one cross-division game per year.

For the 2020 season, changes were made to the football schedule model due to the COVID-19 pandemic. The use of divisions was suspended, with conference games being scheduled on a regional basis. The top two teams by winning percentage against conference opponents advanced to the ACC Championship Game. All teams played 10 conference games and were permitted to play one non-conference game of their choice as long as the game was played in-state. In addition, Notre Dame played an ACC conference schedule and was eligible to (and ultimately did) play in the ACC Championship Game.

Bowl games
Within the College Football Playoff, the Orange Bowl serves as the home of the ACC champion against Notre Dame or another team from the SEC or Big Ten. If the conference's champion is selected for the CFP, another ACC team will be chosen in their place.

The other bowls pick ACC teams in the order set by agreements between the conference and the bowls.

Beginning in 2014, Notre Dame is eligible for selection as the ACC's representative to any of its contracted bowl games. The ACC's bowl selection will no longer be bound by the rigidity of a "one-win rule" but will have a general list of criteria to emphasize regionality and quality matchups on the field. A one-win rule does apply to Notre Dame's participation in the ACC Bowl structure. Notre Dame is now eligible for ACC Bowl selection beginning with the Outback Bowl and continuing through the league's bowl selections. However, Notre Dame must be within one win of the ACC available team which has the best overall record, in order to be chosen. In other words, if an ACC team were 9–3, a 7–5 Notre Dame team could not be chosen in its place. Notre Dame would have to be 8–4 to be chosen over a 9–3 league team. For the 2020 season only, Notre Dame competed for the ACC conference championship and was eligible for all games, including the Orange Bowl.

* If the ACC Champion is not in one of the semifinal games it will appear in the Orange Bowl or, if the Orange Bowl is a semifinal site, either the Peach Bowl or the Fiesta Bowl. There is no limit on how many teams the College Football Playoff may choose from a particular conference.

** Only if the ACC opponent in the Orange Bowl, in a non-semifinal year is a team from the Big Ten, a maximum of three times in six years.

National championships
Although the NCAA does not determine an official national champion for Division I FBS football, several ACC members claim national championships awarded by various "major selectors" of national championships as recognized in the official NCAA Football Bowl Subdivision Records. Since 1936 and 1950 respectively, these include what are now the most pervasive and influential selectors, the Associated Press poll and Coaches Poll. In addition, from 1998 to 2013 the Bowl Championship Series (BCS) used a mathematical formula to match the top two teams at the end of the season. The winner of the BCS was contractually awarded the Coaches' Poll national championship and its AFCA National Championship Trophy as well as the MacArthur Trophy from the National Football Foundation. Maryland won one championship as a member of the ACC in 1953.

 Italics denote championships won before the school joined the ACC.
 In addition, non-football member Notre Dame claims 11 national titles. Many sources, however, credit the Fighting Irish with 13. See Notre Dame Fighting Irish football national championships for more details.

Basketball

History

The early roots of ACC basketball began primarily thanks to two men: Everett Case and Frank McGuire.
Case accepted the head coaching job at North Carolina State. Case's North Carolina State teams dominated the early years of the ACC with a modern, fast-paced style of play. He became the fastest college basketball coach to reach many "games won" milestones.
Case became known as The Father of ACC Basketball. Despite his success on the court, he may have been even a better promoter off-the-court. Case realized the need to sell his program and university. State started construction on Reynolds Coliseum in 1941. Case persuaded school officials to expand the arena to 12,400 people. It opened as the new home court for his team in 1949; at the time, it was the largest on-campus arena in the South. As such, it was used as the host site for many Southern Conference tournaments, ACC tournaments, and the Dixie Classic. The Dixie Classic brought in large revenues for all schools involved and soon became one of the premier sporting events in the South.

Partly to counter Case's success, North Carolina convinced Frank McGuire to come to Chapel Hill in 1952. McGuire knew that, largely due to Case's influence, basketball was now the major high school athletic event of the region. He not only tapped the growing market of high school talent in North Carolina, but also brought several recruits from his home territory in New York City as well. Case and McGuire literally invented a rivalry. Both men realized the benefits created through a rivalry between them. It brought more national attention to both of their programs and increased fan support on both sides.

After State was slapped with crippling NCAA sanctions before the 1956–57 season, McGuire's North Carolina team delivered the ACC its first national championship. During the Tar Heels' championship run, Greensboro entrepreneur Castleman D. Chesley noticed the popularity that it generated. He cobbled together a five-station television network to broadcast the Final Four. That network began broadcasting regular season ACC games the following season—the ancestor of the television package from Raycom Sports. From that point on, ACC basketball gained large popularity.

The ACC has been the home of many prominent basketball coaches besides Case and McGuire, including Terry Holland and Tony Bennett of Virginia; Vic Bubas and Mike Krzyzewski of Duke; Press Maravich, Norm Sloan and Jim Valvano of North Carolina State; Dean Smith and Roy Williams of North Carolina; Bones McKinney of Wake Forest; Lefty Driesell and Gary Williams of Maryland; Bobby Cremins of Georgia Tech; Jim Boeheim of Syracuse; Jim Larrañaga of Miami; and Rick Pitino of Louisville.

Tournament as championship

Possibly Case's most lasting contribution is the ACC tournament, which was first played in 1954 and decides the winner of the ACC title. The ACC is unique in that it is the only Division I college basketball conference that does not officially recognize a regular season champion. This started when only one school per conference made the NCAA tournament. The ACC representative was determined by conference tournament rather than the regular season result. Therefore, the league eliminated the regular season title in 1961, choosing to recognize only the winner of the ACC tournament as conference champion. Fans and media do claim a regular-season title for the team that finishes first, and the NCAA recognizes a regular-season title winner in order to maintain its system of choosing NIT and NCAA tournament berths based on regular season placement. For the ACC, the unofficial crowning of a regular season champion is insignificant as a 1975 NCAA rule change allowed more than one team per conference to earn a bid to the NCAA tournament. As a result, the team finishing atop the ACC regular-season standings has invariably been invited to the NCAA tournament even if it did not win the ACC Tournament. Even so, any claim to a regular season "title" remains unofficial and carries no reward other than top seed in the ACC tournament.

Historically, the ACC has been dominated by the four teams from Tobacco Road in North Carolina—North Carolina, Duke, North Carolina State and Wake Forest. Between them, they have won 50 tournament titles. They have also won or shared 59 regular season titles, including all but four since 1981. The Virginia Cavaliers, however, won the regular season titles in 2014 and 2015, becoming the first ACC team besides Duke or North Carolina to solely win back-to-back regular season titles since 1974.

Present-day schedule

For 53 years, the ACC employed a double round-robin schedule in the regular season, in which each team played the others twice a season. With the expansion to 12 members by the 2005–2006 season, the ACC schedule could no longer accommodate this format. In the new scheduling format that was agreed to, each team was assigned two permanent partners and nine rotating partners over a three-year period. Teams played their permanent partners in a home-and-away series each year. The rotating partners were split into three groups: three teams played in a home-and-away series, three teams played at home, and three teams played on the road. The rotating partner groups were rotated so that a team would play each permanent partner six times, and each rotating partner four times, over a three-year period.

For the 2012–13 season, the 12-team in-conference schedule expanded to 18. Originally for the 2013–14 season, the expanded 14-team, 18-game schedule was to consist of a home and away game with a "primary partner" while the remaining conference opponents would have rotated in groups of three: one year both home and away, one year at home only, and one year away only. However, when Notre Dame was also added for the 2013–14 season, the now 15-team, 18-game schedule was modified so each school played two "Partners" home and away annually, two home and away, five home, and the other five away. In 2013–14, after 1 year at 18 games, women's basketball went back to a 16-game schedule where each team only plays 2 teams twice, rotating opponents each year over seven years and has no permanent partners. In 2019–2020, with the launch of the ACC Network, the men's schedule expanded to 20 games and the women's schedule expanded to 18 games.

The ACC and the Big Ten Conference have held the ACC–Big Ten Challenge each season since 1999. The competition is a series of regular-season games pitting ACC and Big Ten teams against each other. Each team typically plays one Challenge game each season, except for a few teams from the larger conference that are left out due to unequal conference sizes. The first ACC–Big Ten Women's Challenge was played in 2007, and has the same format as the men's Challenge.

National championships and Final Fours
Over the course of its existence, ACC schools have captured 15 NCAA men's basketball championships while members of the conference. North Carolina has won six, Duke has won five, NC State has won two, and Maryland and Virginia have each won one. Four more national titles were won by current ACC members while in other conferences—three by 2014 arrival Louisville and one by 2013 arrival Syracuse; Louisville was forced to vacate the third national title due to NCAA sanctions. Seven of the 12 pre-2013 members have advanced to the Final Four at least once while members of the ACC. Another pre-2013 member, Florida State, made the Final Four once before joining the ACC. All three schools that entered the ACC in 2013, as well as Louisville, advanced to the Final Four at least once before joining the conference.

Also notable are earlier national championships from historical eras prior to the dominance of the NCAA-administered championship. The ACC is often credited with forcing the NCAA tournament to expand to allow more than one team per conference, creating the at-large NCAA field common today. The Helms Athletic Foundation selected national champions for seasons predating the beginning of the NCAA tournament (1939), including North Carolina, Notre Dame, Pitt, and Syracuse. Prior to the at-large era (1975), the National Invitation Tournament championship had prestige comparable to the NCAA championship, and Louisville, North Carolina, Maryland, and Virginia Tech won titles during this period (later NIT titles are not considered consensus national championships).

In women's basketball, ACC members have won three national championships while in the conference, North Carolina in 1994, Maryland in 2006, and Notre Dame in 2018. Notre Dame, which joined in 2013, also previously won the national title in 2001. In 2006, Duke, Maryland, and North Carolina all advanced to the Final Four, the first time a conference placed three teams in the women's Final Four. Both finalists were from the ACC, with Maryland defeating Duke for the title.

Italics denotes honors earned before the school joined the ACC. Women's national championship tournaments prior to 1982 were run by the AIAW.

Baseball

ACC Baseball is one of two ACC sponsored sports divided into the Atlantic and Coastal Divisions, which are shown below:

These divisions paralleled the former divisions of ACC football with the exception Notre Dame replacing Syracuse, the only ACC school which does not field a baseball team, within the Atlantic Division, giving both divisions seven teams. Louisville replaced Maryland in the Atlantic Division beginning with the 2015 season.

Eight ACC teams were selected to play in the 2019 NCAA Division I baseball tournament, with Florida State and Louisville advancing to the College World Series. The ACC has won the College World Series twice: by the Virginia Cavaliers in 2015 and by Wake Forest in 1955. In addition, Miami won four titles before joining the ACC, and South Carolina has won two titles since leaving the league. Current member schools have appeared in the College World Series a combined total of 93 times (including appearances before joining the conference). In 2016, the ACC was ranked as the top baseball conference by Rating Percentage Index (RPI); the conference has ranked among the top three by this measure each of the past 10 years.

^ Syracuse does not currently field a baseball team but has one appearance in the NCAA baseball tournament prior to joining the conference.
† The count of College World Series appearances includes those made by the school prior to joining the ACC:
 Boston College: 4 appearances
 Florida State: 11 appearances
 Louisville: 3 appearances
 Miami: 21 appearances
 Notre Dame: 2 appearances
 Syracuse: 1 appearance

Field hockey
The ACC has won 21 of the 41 NCAA Championships in field hockey. Maryland won 8 as a member of the ACC.

Golf
Of the current ACC members, 12 sponsor men's golf and 10 sponsor women's golf. Four team national championships in men's golf and seven national titles in women's golf have been won by ACC members while in the conference, led by the Duke women's team that has won seven national titles since 1999. In addition, two more team national titles, one in men's golf and one in women's golf, have been won by current ACC members before they joined the conference.

 Italics denote championships won before the school joined the ACC.

Lacrosse
Since 1971, when the first men's national champion was determined by the NCAA, the ACC has won 17 NCAA championships, more than any other conference in college lacrosse. Virginia has won seven NCAA Championships, North Carolina has won five, and Duke has won three. Former ACC member Maryland won two NCAA Championships as an ACC member. In addition, prior to the establishment of the NCAA tournament, Maryland had won nine national championships while Virginia won two. Syracuse, which joined the ACC in 2013, won ten NCAA-sponsored national championships, the most ever by any Division I lacrosse program, before joining the conference. Since 1987, the only years in which the national championship game did not feature a current ACC member were 2015 and 2017.

Women's lacrosse has awarded a national championship since 1982, and the ACC has won more titles than any other conference. In all, the ACC has won 12 women's national championships since the conference began sponsoring the sport in 1997: Former ACC member Maryland has won seven, North Carolina has won three, while Virginia and Boston College each have won once. Additionally, Maryland won four and Virginia two as independents.

{| class="wikitable sortable" style="text-align: center;"
|+ National Championships & Runner-Up Finishes
! style="width:90px;"|  University
! style="width:145px;"| Men's NCAAChampionships
! style="width:125px;"| Men's NCAARunner-Up
! style="width:145px;"| Pre-NCAA Men's Championships
! style="width:120px;"| Women's NCAAChampionships
! style="width:120px;"| Women's NCAARunner-Up
|-
| Virginia
| 2021, 2019, 2011,2006, 2003, 1999,1972
| 1996, 1994, 1986,1980
| 1970, 1952
| 2004, 1993, 1991
|2007, 2005, 2003,1999, 1998, 1996
|-
| North Carolina
| 2016, 1991, 1986,1982, 1981
| 1993
| 
| 2022, 2016, 2013
|2009
|-
| Duke
| 2014, 2013, 2010
| 2018, 2007, 2005
|
|
|
|-
| Syracuse
| 2009, 2008, 2004,2002, 2000, 1995,1993, 1990*, 1989,1988, 1983
| 2013, 2001, 1999,1992, 1985, 1984
| 1925, 1924, 1922,1920
|
| 2021, 2014, 2012 
|-
| Notre Dame
| 
| 2014, 2010
|
|
| 
|-
|Boston College
|
|
|
|2021
|2019, 2018, 2017
|}

Italics denotes championships before it was part of the ACC.*' Syracuse vacated its 1990 championship due to NCAA violations.

Soccer

Men's soccer is the only other ACC sponsored sport currently divided into divisions, which are as follows:

Twelve of the fifteen ACC schools sponsor men's soccer — a higher proportion than any of the other Power Five conferences. Only the three southernmost ACC schools — Georgia Tech, Florida State, and Miami — do not sponsor soccer.
Virginia has won 7 NCAA titles, and more since 1990 than any other university in the country. The ACC overall has won 19 national championships, including 16 of the 31 seasons between 1984 and 2014. Seven of the championships were won by Virginia, with the remaining nine by: Maryland (three times while they were in the ACC), Clemson (three times), North Carolina (twice), Duke, Wake Forest, Notre Dame, and Syracuse.

In women's soccer, North Carolina has won 21 of the 39 NCAA titles since the NCAA crowned its first champion, as well as the only Association for Intercollegiate Athletics for Women (AIAW) soccer championship in 1981. The Tar Heels have also won 22 of the 33 ACC tournaments. They lost in the final to North Carolina State in 1988 and Virginia in 2004, both times by penalty kicks. The 2010 tournament was the first in which they failed to make the championship game, falling to eventual champion Wake Forest in the semi-finals. The 2012 ACC tournament saw North Carolina's first quarterfinal loss, to the eventual champion Virginia; however, the Tar Heels went on to win the national title that season. In 2014, Florida State became the first school other than North Carolina to win the national championship as an ACC member. Notre Dame won three NCAA titles before it joined the ACC in 2013. The 2020 NCAA tournament, in which Florida State was national runner-up, was delayed until the spring of 2021 due to the coronavirus pandemic, but is listed as 2020 to distinguish it from the fall of 2021 season.

 Italics denote championships before the school was part of the ACC. Commissioners 

NCAA team championships

The North Carolina Tar Heels lead the ACC with 34 women's NCAA titles and in overall NCAA titles with 47, while the Virginia Cavaliers lead in men's titles with 22. Excluded from this list are all national championships earned outside the scope of NCAA competition, including Division I FBS football titles, women's AIAW championships, equestrian titles, and retroactive Helms Athletic Foundation titles.

Capital One Cup standings
The Capital One Cup is an award given annually to the best men's and women's Division I college athletics programs in the United States. Points are earned throughout the year based on final standings of NCAA Championships and final coaches' poll rankings.

Virginia (2015 and 2019) and Notre Dame (2014 and 2022) have twice finished first for men's sports. North Carolina (2013) has once finished first on the women's side.

The following table displays ACC top 20 finishes in the Capital One Cup.

Media

Former
Raycom Sports (1982–2019)
ACC Network (syndication package) (1982–2019)

Current
ESPN 
ACC Network (Launched in 2019)
ACC RSN

See also
 ACC Athlete of the Year
 Atlantic Coast Conference Men's Basketball Player of the Year
 List of American collegiate athletic stadiums and arenas
 List of Atlantic Coast Conference football champions
 List of Atlantic Coast Conference men's basketball regular season champions
 List of Atlantic Coast Conference business schools
 ACC Women's Basketball regular season
 Atlantic Coast Rugby League

Notes

References

Further reading
 Walker, J. Samuel, ACC Basketball: The Story of the Rivalries, Traditions, and Scandals of the First Two Decades of the Atlantic Coast Conference.'' Chapel Hill, North Carolina: University of North Carolina Press, 2011.

External links

 
 ACC Academic Consortium

 
1953 establishments in the United States
Articles which contain graphical timelines
Companies based in Greensboro, North Carolina
Sports in the Southern United States
Sports organizations established in 1953